Russian traditions, superstitions and beliefs include superstitions and customs of Russians. Many of them are now inseparable parts of everyday life, or simply common social etiquette, though they often have their origins in superstition. Awareness of them, and their perceived importance, depends on various factors including region and age. Some are extremely common and practiced by the vast majority of the population, while some are extremely obscure and could be more regional.

Customs that are more often regarded as superstition
Hands that itch are an omen that one will come into wealth.
Before leaving for a long journey, travelers, and all those who are seeing them off, must sit for a moment in silence before leaving the house. It is often conveniently written off as a time to sit and think of anything one may have forgotten. Another version of the superstition states that the traveler must sit for a moment on or beside their suitcase. It is often said "let's sit down before a journey".
After someone has left the house on a long journey, their room and/or their things should not be cleaned up until they have returned, or at least a day has passed if there are guests in a house.
It is claimed bad luck to do any act of romance on any 18th day of the month in the Gregorian calendar.
Knocking on wood is practiced in Russia as in other countries. However Russians tend to add a symbolic three spits over one's left shoulder (or simply with the head turned to the left), and Russians will often knock three times as well. Traditionally one was spitting on the devil (who is always on the left).
Breaking a mirror is considered bad luck in Russia, as is looking at one's reflection in a broken mirror, but the effect is also more severe than 7 years of bad luck (as in American culture). Sometimes it is bad luck to use mirrors thrown away by someone else.
It is bad luck to use physical hand gestures to demonstrate something negative (like injury) using oneself or someone else as the object. For example, when describing a scar you saw on someone's face you should not gesture on your own face or someone else's. If you must, you can demonstrate in mid-air. If one does it without realizing, it can be countered by making a hand motion towards the body part used and then an abrupt motion away (as if to pick up the bad energy and throw it away) or by wiping the area with your hand and then blowing on your hand (as if to wipe off the bad energy and then blow it away). This is also a case where spitting over one's left shoulder may be used.
If one person accidentally steps on another person's foot, it is common for the person who was stepped on to lightly step on the foot of the person who stepped first. It is said that they thus avoid a future conflict.
Birthday parties should be celebrated on or after one's birthday, not before. So when one's birthday falls during the week, it is best to celebrate the following weekend. Never give someone birthday wishes before their birthday.
Talking about future success, especially boasting about it, is considered bad luck. It is considered better to be silent until the success has been achieved or to even sound pessimistic.
Returning home for forgotten things is a bad omen. It is better to leave it behind, but if returning is necessary, one should look in the mirror before leaving the house again. Otherwise the journey will be bad.
Many Russians consider giving gifts of sharp objects, like knives or scissors, to be taboo. This taboo may be avoided by the donor taking a symbolic payment, for example one Russian ruble, in exchange as if it is a trade, not a gift.
Birds that land on a windowsill should be chased away. If they tap on the window, or fly into it (open or closed) it is considered a very bad omen (often of death or the loss of a leg or two).
If a chicken crows at you three times before noon, the death of a close family member can be expected within a fortnight. The chicken should be killed, but not eaten, as consuming it will bring about further misfortune.
It is often considered taboo to step over people, or parts of their body, who are on the ground. It is often said that it will prevent the person from growing (if they are not fully grown already). It is better to politely ask the person to move or to find a way around them. If one accidentally steps over a person (or people), it is sometimes standard to step backwards over them to "undo" the previous harm done.
Unmarried people should not sit at the corner of the table. Otherwise they will not marry. This mostly applies to girls, and often only young girls. Sometimes it is said that the affected individual will not marry for 7 years, making it all right for young children to sit there.
When giving an animal as a gift (a cat, dog, bird, etc.), the receiver should give the giver a symbolic sum of money, for example one Russian ruble.
A purse (or any other money holder) given as a gift requires a little money inside. If it is empty it is said to cause bad financial luck.
A funeral procession brings good luck, but one should never cross its path or it is bad luck.
A woman with empty water buckets coming towards you is considered a bad omen.
A group of two or more people should not walk on different sides of a tree. They should all keep to one side or the other.
Bread should only be cut with a knife, not with your hands. Otherwise, it is said that your life will be broken. The opposite is held true by some people.
Two or more people should never use one towel at the same time to dry their hands or bodies, it is said to bring conflict.
It is good luck to trip on your left foot.
One should never hand a knife directly to another person, as it is said that the two will get into a fight. Instead a person should always place the knife down on a surface, and only then can the other person pick it up. In several cases you can give it directly, but only pointing the sharp end to yourself and making the knife's handle accessible for the opposite person.
One is to never lick food off a knife. It is believed that doing so makes you a cruel person.
 If one feels that they may have been cursed by someone (had the "evil eye" put on them) or just has the feeling of a hostile presence, it is recommended to remove one's coat and then put it back on starting with the hand opposite the usually used one. It is also recommended to pin a French Pin inside your clothing to avoid the curse of the evil eye in the first place.
One should not shake hands or give something across a threshold such as a door frame, window frame, or a state border. It is considered proper to either invite the person outside in or to step outside to shake hands if parting.
Whistling in a house would bring misfortune to that household (see origins below).
It is considered taboo to give something that is broken or has a defect as a gift.
If one walks underneath or ducks under the arm of another person, they must go back underneath that person's arm. Otherwise, they will never grow to their full height.

Newborns 

Things bought for a newborn baby (such as clothes, toys, furniture, etc.) should only be purchased after the baby is born. This is usually done in a big hurry as a result.
A stranger should not look at a newborn baby before it is a certain age (between two months and one year). If one looks at the baby it is considered bad luck to compliment it.
Mothers typically do not show their baby to anyone except the boys, the midwife and other close relatives for forty eight hours after the baby is born.

Exams 
Before one takes an exam, someone else would say, "ни пуха ни пера!" which roughly translates to "neither fur, nor feather!" which means bad luck. To this, the one taking the exam would reply, "К чёрту!" which means, "Go to the Devil!" or "To the Devil!" which is a way of countering bad luck. Originally this had been used by hunters - one wished another bad luck ("So you would hunt neither hare, nor duck"), and another countered bad luck by mentioning the devil.
On examination day, it is bad luck to make your bed, wear anything new, or cut your fingernails.

Traditions for the use of alcohol in Russia
When you're having alcohol, especially vodka, the glass must be drunk until it is gone, "to the bottom" of it. However the glass is not to be poured full if one wishes a bit.
If one raised a glass with alcohol during a toast, one should not put a glass with alcohol back on the table until toast is finished. However it refers only to shot-type strong alcohol which you are supposed to drink at once. Wine, long drink cocktails and beer do not fall under the rule as they are meant to be sipped.
Traditionally alcohol is poured out to all the people present, though they are not required to drink.
One should not make a long interruption between first and second shots.
The latecomer must drink a full glass. (so-called "penalty")
Outgoing guest must drink last glass, so-called "na pososhok". Literally it is translated "On a small (walking) staff", really means "For lucky way".
As a rule, every portion of spirit is accompanied by a touch of glasses and a toast pronounced. Funerals and commemorations are exceptions; there the touch of glasses is forbidden.
It is not allowed to pour out by hand holding a bottle from below. When pouring, one is expected to keep another hand away from a glass. This is often described as centuries old tradition preventing culprits from poisoning their victims.
It is not allowed to fill a glass being held in the air.
It is considered bad luck to make a toast with an empty glass. If done, the toaster must finish off the bottle of what he had last.
It is considered bad luck to put an empty bottle back on the table when it is finished.

"Cause and effect" Russian superstitions
 If your ears or cheeks are hot, someone is thinking or talking about you (usually speaking ill).
 If your nose itches, you'll be drinking soon. For children they might say, "You'll get hit in the nose".
 If your right eye itches, you're going to be happy soon. If your left eye itches, you'll be sad.
 If your lips itch, you'll be kissing someone soon.
 If your right hand itches, you're going to get money soon. It sometimes means you're going to greet someone. If your left hand itches, you're going to give someone money.
 If you have the hiccups, someone is remembering you at this moment.
 If an eyelash falls out you'll receive a gift. If someone finds an eyelash on someone they will sometimes let the person blow it away and make a wish.
 If a fork or spoon falls on the ground, expect a female guest. If a knife falls, expect a male guest.
 If you eat from a knife, you'll be "angry like a dog".
 If someone is not recognized when seen or heard, they will be rich. So if someone calls you on the phone and you don't recognize them you can cheer them up by telling them they'll be rich.
 If someone was talking about you before you entered the room/conversation, then you will live a long and rich life.
 If a cat is washing its face, expect guests soon.
 If a black cat crosses your path, it is bad luck (though not unique to Russian tradition). People will often avoid crossing the place where it crossed, or will at least wait for someone else to cross it first.
 If a hare crosses your path, it is bad luck. This is much less common than the cat superstition, which is understandable given the lack of hares in urban conditions.
 If you spill salt, it is bad luck and is said to bring conflict, but no one will throw salt over their left shoulder.
 If you step on a crack, it is bad luck. This one isn't very common, and Russians who do avoid cracks don't do it in an effort to save their mother's backs.
 If it is raining when you leave a place, it means you'll return, and it is considered a generally good omen.
 If it rains on someone's wedding, it means they'll be wealthy.
 If someone sneezes while telling something, it means they are telling the truth.
 If one or more birds defecate on you or your property (commonly cars), it is good luck, and may bring you riches.
 If you find a bay leaf in your soup (commonly Borshch) while eating, it means you'll get mail from someone.
 If you wear clothes (such as an undershirt) inside out, you will get beaten. Your friend should point this out, wait for you to fix the clothes, and then punch you symbolically. If you noticed it yourself, take the piece of clothing off, put it on the ground and step on it.
 Lucky in cards not lucky in love. This, however, is only a pre-marital superstition. The reason for the division is that marriage is a sacrament in the Russian Orthodox Church, and this sacrament, ordained by God, eviscerates the pre-marital superstition. Thus, when a man is bonded by divine sacrament to a single woman whom he loves the cause and effect is reversed: namely, his married love for a single woman, and her love for him, will bring him good fortune in all endeavors including cards.
 If you wear a shirt backwards, you will become acquainted with someone new.
 In Russian superstition if a couple sets a wedding date and doesn't end up getting married on that date, they can not set another date and should not get married as their union will be cursed.
 Accidentally breaking a glass is considered good luck.
 If one tripped on their left leg and was born on an odd-numbered day, or tripped on their right foot and was born on an even-numbered day, one should ask someone else to slap their corresponding hand in order to negate the bad luck.
 If you have ringing in one of your ears, ask someone which ear is ringing. If they guessed right, you should both make a wish.
 If someone does something bad, a ghost may take a possession owned by the family. If the sinner repents, the ghost will return the item sometime during the week of their birthday.
If someone whistles inside a house, they will become financially irresponsible and lose money.
 If you find yourself standing between people with identical names, you should make a wish and it will come true.
Russia lacks some of the superstitions Westerners find commonplace. Most Russians are not particularly concerned with the number , opening umbrellas indoors or walking under ladders. Archaically though, the number 13 might have been considered a "devil's number". This is because it could only be divided by itself, contrasted with a widely used number 12 for counting.

Communion or hold conversations with demons. Sorcerers primarily used black magic to summon devils. The goals of summoning devils include attaining wealth, fame, approval of superiors, sex, or harming another person. Those that rejected Christianity and sought the Devil felt that the Devil was as strong as God and impious spells were more powerful than prayer.

Love magic

Romance was connected with magic and sorcery even until the 18th century when it became a prevalent literary theme. Neighbors suspected magic to be the cause of people so passionate that they lost their senses. Christianity supported marriage and child-bearing, but it did not support the pursuit of pleasures of the flesh. This ban did not stop people from employing the Devil to get their share of pleasure. For men the usual aim was sex, but for women it could have been to get married, exact revenge, or regain a husband's affection.

Death
There are many interpretations of death in Russian folk tradition. It can be reversible, and it sometimes resides outside of the body. It is also closely related to sleep. It is believed that when one sleeps one can traverse the “other world” and come back alive. There are two kinds of deaths. A person who dies in their old age surrounded by family died a “good” death, a death that was “their own.” They depart when God says they should. A person who dies a “bad” death, or a death “not their own,” died too soon before the time God assigned them. These people may have been murdered, committed suicide, died of illness, or in war. Because of the nature of these deaths the earth cannot accept them until their time comes, which means they do not receive a proper burial. Sometimes they are not buried at all, but covered with rocks or sticks. Russians associate “good” deaths with bringing good harvests, while attributing storms, droughts, and other forms of destruction to “bad” deaths.

Funeral rites
Several steps must be taken once a person has died so their body can be buried and their soul can travel to the “other world.” The first step is washing the body. In a Dual-Faith (dvoeverie) setting (in which Orthodoxy and folk tradition are combined) this ritual prepares the deceased for their meeting with God. They then dress the body in all white, handmade clothing, left slightly unfinished because it belongs not in this world but the “other world.” In Christianity, the white clothing worn by the corpse represents the pure life the deceased promised to live when they were baptized.

The body must wear a belt during its burial because the deceased will need it when they are resurrected during the Last Judgment. Belts are significant in both Christian and folk rituals. Babies receive them, along with a cross, at their christening. It symbolizes a person's commitment to Christianity. In folk tradition, belts mark out an individual's private space and prove that they are a member of society, as well as protecting the wearer from dark forces.

After washing and dressing the body, the body is laid out in the house for three days before it is put it in the coffin. Orthodox households and Old Belief (pre-1650 Orthodoxy) households perform this ritual slightly differently. Orthodox families lay their dead loved one so their head points towards the icon corner. In the houses of Old Believers the feet are placed closer to the icon corner so the deceased faces the corner and can pray if they desire. Old Believers believe that the dead can still feel for a time after their death. For fear of waking the newly dead, mourning does not begin during the washing or dressing. Inappropriate funeral etiquette can also wake the dead.

The coffin, sometimes referred to as the “new living room,”  is very comfortable, made like a bed with a pillow stuffed with birch bark or wood shavings. Mourners place objects in the coffin that the body might need after death such as money, food, favorite belongings, and reflections of status or occupation. Traditionally, men carry the coffin on their backs to the cemetery where the burial will take place.

At the funeral, a priest performs the “seeing off” ceremony, praying over the body and allowing mourners to throw dirt on the grave, symbolically incorporating the corpse into the earth. The priest then places a paper crown on the head of the deceased and the mourners throw soil and coins into the grave (the coins are either to pay for transit to the “other world” or for the space in the cemetery). After the funeral, mourners sing laments depicting the deceased leaving their family and the soul departing from the body.

It is also important to throw away any handkerchiefs used to wipe away tears at the funeral. You should under no circumstances bring it home, as it is believed that if you do this you are bringing tears into the house.

The soul
Russian folk culture depicts the soul either as small and childlike, or having wings and flying. For forty days after a funeral, the soul of the deceased visits places it liked or places where it sinned to ask for forgiveness. After forty days the deceased's family sets a place for their loved one at dinner, inviting them to join them for their own commemoration. When the family sees that the skin goes untouched they know their loved one has gone.

Archaic superstitions

The Unclean Force
The phrase Unclean Force (Нечистая сила) refers to both the Devil and all demons and potentially harmful things in the Russian pantheon. Although the beings of the unclean force resided primarily in the spirit realm (тот свет), they were able to manifest themselves in this world in many forms, the most well known included the domovoi, leshy, kikimora, vodianoi, and rusalka. Also counted among the unclean force are sorcerers, witches, the undead, and the "unclean dead", including suicides, those who died of drunkenness, victims of accidents and violent deaths, unbaptized infants, and vampires. Likewise, strangers and people of other religions were viewed as possessing the unclean force.

Among these spirits, the domovoi was considered the least dangerous. If angered, the domovoi would act as a poltergeist. Other spirits, like the rusalka, were more malevolent. She was said to lure men to their watery deaths. Among the places where the unclean force was strongest against the Russian peasant were the crossroads, the threshold and the bathhouse.

Spoiling
Related to the unclean force was the superstitious belief in "spoiling" (порча). One aligned with the unclean force could spoil another through the use of the evil eye or by means of a magical ritual. The spoiled person would be inflicted with such maladies and misfortunes as sickness, mental illness, deformity, loss of livelihood, and death. One type of spoiling was a form of hysteria called klikushestvo (кликушество). It caused the bewitched person to shriek, curse, and fall to the floor when in the presence of religious objects or displays.

See also

Folklore of Russia
Russian culture
Slavic mythology

References

External links
Russian superstitions at the Slavic Paganism Encyclopedia 
Russian superstitions in an article 
Another article
A collection of Russian superstitions
Another article
A collection of them
Twelve Russian superstitions

nature spirits
 
 
Superstitions of Europe
Superstitions of Asia